The Hannover CL.V was a biplane ground-attack aircraft built in Germany during World War I, which saw some service and additional production in Norway following the war.

Development
Derived from the Hannover CL.II, the CL.V shared the same conventional biplane configuration and incorporated the overhanging, aerodynamically-balanced ailerons developed for the Hannover CL.III. The characteristic biplane tail used on earlier Hannover CL-class machines was dispensed with, and a conventional empennage was fitted to the prototype, although German production machines reverted to the earlier tail.

The CL.V was first tested in July 1918, which led to an initial order from Idflieg for 20 aircraft powered by the Mercedes D.III engine for evaluation.  Further orders followed for CL.Vs powered by the BMW IIIa engine, which gave superior performance and were intended as dedicated two-seat fighters.  Only 46 were built before the end of the war, and none of them had been put into service by that time. Hannover built another 62 examples after the Armistice.

In its civil configuration, designated F.6, the aircraft dispensed with the rear cockpit, and used the monoplane tail unit that had been fitted to the CL.V prototype. One stripped-down example was used to set a world altitude record of 8,340 m (27,335 ft) on 22 October 1919.

In 1923, another 14 CL.Vs were produced for the Norwegian Army Air Service by Kjeller Flyvemaskinsfabrik with the original monoplane tail. These were known by the Norwegians as the Kjeller FF.7 Hauk ("Hawk") and remained in service until 1929.

Operators

Luftstreitkräfte

Norwegian Army Air Service

Survivors
 Kjeller FF7. Hauk. Cockpit section at Norwegian Museum of Science and Technology in Oslo, Norway

Specifications (CL.V)

Notes

Bibliography
 

 
 

1910s German attack aircraft
Hannover aircraft
Single-engined tractor aircraft
Aircraft first flown in 1918
Biplanes